Sheldon Andrew Price (born March 26, 1991) is a free agent American football cornerback. He played college football at UCLA, and signed with the Indianapolis Colts as an undrafted free agent in 2013. He has also played for the Baltimore Ravens and Kansas City Chiefs.

Early years
Price attended Bishop Amat High School of La Puente, California. He was selected to the SuperPrep All-Far West team, Scout.com West Hot 150 (ranked as the 81st prospect). Price was also selected to the Tacoma News-Tribune Western 100 and CalHiSports.com All-State third-team during high school. In his junior year of high school, he was selected first-team all-league team and second-team All-San Gabriel Valley.

College career
Price played college football for the UCLA Bruins. In his freshman season, he was selected for The Sporting News' Pac-10 All-Freshman team and the Rivals.com All-America Team. He was a co-winner of the UCLA's John Boncheff Jr. Memorial Award for Rookie of the Year following his freshman season. He finished college with a total of 157 tackles, 5 Interceptions, 26 Pass Deflections and 2 Forced fumbles. He was selected to participate in the 2013 East-West Shrine Game on the West team.

Professional career

Indianapolis Colts
On April 27, 2013, Price signed with the Indianapolis Colts as an undrafted free agent. Price was waived injured on September 25, 2015.

Baltimore Ravens
On October 20, 2015, Price signed to the Baltimore Ravens practice squad. He was elevated to the active roster on December 29, 2015.

On October 11, 2016, Price was placed on injured reserve after suffering a biceps injury in Week 5.

On September 16, 2017, Price was placed on injured reserve with a concussion. He was released on October 19, 2017.

Kansas City Chiefs
On January 3, 2018, Price signed a reserve/future contract with the Kansas City Chiefs. He was released on May 1, 2018.

Arizona Hotshots
Price signed with the Arizona Hotshots of the Alliance of American Football for the 2019 season, but was waived on January 8, 2019, before the start of the regular season.

Montreal Alouettes
On May 21, 2019, Price signed with the Montreal Alouettes of the Canadian Football League.

Personal life
He is the son of Dennis and Letitia Price, both UCLA graduates. His sister, Kylie, was a member of the UCLA women's track and field team as an All-American long jumper. His father Dennis Price played college football at UCLA and was a fifth round selection of the 1988 NFL Draft by the Los Angeles Raiders. He played four NFL seasons at cornerback, two each with the Los Angeles Raiders (1988–1989) and New York Jets (1991–1992). Price's cousin is former NBA player Harold Ellis.

References

External links
UCLA Bruins bio
Indianapolis Colts bio

1991 births
Living people
American football cornerbacks
UCLA Bruins football players
Indianapolis Colts players
Baltimore Ravens players
Kansas City Chiefs players
Arizona Hotshots players